Recon  may refer to:

 Reconnaissance, a military term for gathering information
 Halo 3: Recon, a standalone expansion for the video game Halo 3
 "Recon" (Lost), the eighth episode of the sixth season of Lost
 Recon (role-playing game), a role-playing game wherein players assume the role of U.S. military characters during the Vietnam War
 Recon (band), an American Christian metal band
 Recon, a short film by Breck Eisner, starring Peter Gabriel
 Recon, a 2019 film directed by Robert David Port 
 Recon Instruments, a technology company specializing in GPS and head-mounted displays
 River, Estuary and Coastal Observing Network, a waterway observing system in North America
 Tom Clancy's Ghost Recon, a series of tactical shooter video games
Recon CS-6, a 2006 Nerf blaster released under the N-Strike series
 Recon, a BDSM social website
 Jeep Recon, an electric sport utility vehicle

See also
 Recce (disambiguation)